Harcourt House may refer to:

 Harcourt House, London, a former palatial residence on Cavendish Square, London
 Harcourt House, Edmonton, an art gallery in Canada
 Harcourt House (Hong Kong), a commercial building